1 Corinthians 5 is the fifth chapter of the First Epistle to the Corinthians in the New Testament of the Christian Bible. It is authored by Paul the Apostle and Sosthenes in Ephesus. In this short chapter, Paul deals with an issue of sexual immorality in the Corinthian church.

Text
The original text was written in Koine Greek. This chapter is divided into 13 verses.

Textual witnesses
Some early manuscripts containing the text of this chapter are:
Codex Vaticanus (AD 325–350)
Codex Sinaiticus (330–360)
Codex Alexandrinus (400–440)
Codex Ephraemi Rescriptus (~450)
Papyrus 11 (7th century; extant verses 5, 7–8)

Sexual immorality and exclusion
"The censure of the party-divisions [addressed in the previous chapters] is concluded", and Paul moves on without transition to a "widely" or "universally"  reported issue of a member of the Corinthian church living with his father's wife and the church failing to remove this man from their fellowship. Paul criticises the church for its arrogance in not taking action, which might have been due to the factional nature of the church or to a false understanding of Christian liberty. In 2 Corinthians 2, Paul commands the church in Corinth to forgive and restore a certain brother to fellowship, apparently the same person.

Immorality defiles the church (5:1–8)

Verses 4–5

"Our Lord Jesus" from the Greek  (following ancient manuscripts B D* 1175 1739). Some variants are found in some extant ancient manuscripts:
, is not found in א A Ψ 1505. The phrase "the Lord Jesus" is found as often as "our Lord Jesus" (cf. 1 Corinthians 11:23; 16:23; 2 Corinthians 4:14; 11:31; Ephesians 1:15; 1 Thessalonians 4:2; 2 Thessalonians 1:7; Philemon 5).
, is found after , in P46 א D2 F G 33 1881 M co and before  in 81. The expression "our Lord Jesus Christ" is often found in Paul's writings (cf. Romans 5:1, 11; 15:6, 30; 1 Corinthians 1:2, 7, 10; 15:57; 2 Corinthians 8:9; Galatians 6:14, 18, Ephesians 1:3, 17; 5:20; 6:24; Colossians 1:3; 1 Thessalonians 1:3; 5:9, 23, 28), more commonly than just "our Lord Jesus" (cf. Romans 16:20; 2 Corinthians 1:14; 1 Thessalonians 2:19; 3:11, 13; 2 Thessalonians 1:8, 12).
The only witnesses that have  (without "our" or "Christ") are A Ψ 1505.
"[The days of] the Lord": from the Greek , is found in P46 B 630 1739; other variants are
 is found in P61vid א Ψ M
, is found in D
, is found in A F G P 33 al.

Verse 6

"Do you not know that a little leaven leavens the whole lump?": This refers to a well-known proverb, much used by the Jews, and other cultures as well, with the meaning that false doctrine increases to more ungodliness, and when not immediately corrected, will endanger the whole community.

Paul's previous letter
Verse 9 refers to an earlier letter written by Paul to the Corinthians, sometimes called the "warning letter" or the "pre-canonical letter". Paraphrase versions like J. B. Philips' translation and the New Testament for Everyone explicitly call this a "previous" letter, supplying a word which is not in the original text. The previous letter had warned members of the church not to associate with people living immoral lives.

Immorality must be judged (5:9–13)

Verse 13

 Verse 13 cross-references Deuteronomy ; ; ;

See also 
 Leaven
 Mesirah, the Jewish practice of handling conduct among themselves and avoiding outside legal authorities
 Related Bible parts: Exodus 3, Deuteronomy 17, 19, 22 and 24; Mark 8, 2 Corinthians 2, Galatians 5, Revelation 2, Revelation 3

References

External links 
 King James Bible - Wikisource
English Translation with Parallel Latin Vulgate
Online Bible at GospelHall.org (ESV, KJV, Darby, American Standard Version, Bible in Basic English)
Multiple bible versions at Bible Gateway (NKJV, NIV, NRSV etc.)

05